Sir Paul Hyacinth Morgan (born 17 August 1952), styled The Hon. Mr Justice Morgan, is a judge of the High Court of England and Wales.

He was educated at St Columb's College and Peterhouse, Cambridge.

He was called to the bar at Lincoln's Inn in 1975. He has been a judge of the High Court of Justice (Chancery Division) since 2007.

References

1952 births
Living people
People educated at St Columb's College
Alumni of Peterhouse, Cambridge
Members of Lincoln's Inn
Chancery Division judges
Knights Bachelor